Colonel Redl (German: Oberst Redl) is a 1925 Austrian silent drama film directed by Hans Otto and starring Robert Valberg, Eugen Neufeld and Harry Norbert. It portrays the career of the Austrian Army Officer Alfred Redl, exposed as a foreign agent shortly before the First World War.

Cast
 Robert Valberg as Oberst Alfred Redl 
 Eugen Neufeld as Oberst Ullmanitzky 
 Harry Norbert as Oberstleutnant Jamischewicz 
 Albert von Kersten as Major Wierenkoff 
 Eugen Dumont as Kriegsminister Rußlands 
 Dagny Servaes as Sonja Uraskow 
 Ellen Reith as Hauptmann Erdmann's Braut 
 Carlos Gerspach as Hauptmann Erdmann 
 Louis Seeman as Gendarmerieoberst Boreff 
 Julius Stärk as Auditor 
 Mella Baffa
 Louis Erdmann

References

Bibliography
  Deborah Holmes & Lisa Silverman. Interwar Vienna: Culture Between Tradition and Modernity. Camden House, 2009.

External links

1925 films
1920s spy drama films
Austrian drama films
Austrian silent feature films
Films directed by Hans Otto
Austrian black-and-white films
Films set in Vienna
Films set in the 1910s
1925 drama films
Silent drama films